The Sovereignists were a right-wing populist political coalition in Serbia that took part in the 2022 general elections. Initially formed as an agreement between the Enough is Enough (DJB) and Healthy Serbia (ZS) political parties, it was transformed into a political coalition in January 2022. In the 2022 general election, it nominated Branka Stamenković as its presidential candidate. However, the coalition failed to cross the threshold and won no seats in the National Assembly.

History

Formation and early history 
During a press conference on 30 November 2021, Saša Radulović, the leader of the Enough is Enough (DJB) political party, announced the formation the "Sovereignists"; initially it was a political agreement between DJB and Healthy Serbia (ZS). DJB had previously used the "Sovereignists" label including in the 2020 parliamentary election. The agreement was mainly formed to lower the potential electoral fraud for the January 2022 constitutional referendum, by signing up election controllers. Milan Stamatović stated that one of the priorities of the Sovereignists would be to protect national interests. DJB claimed that the constitutional referendum was allegedly orchestrated at the will of the European Union and George Soros. The party had called other opposition parties to participate in the campaign by stating their opposition to the constitutional changes. In December, the agreement also gained support from far-right anti-vax activist Jovana Stojković and Čedomir Antić, while Radulović stated that the signatory parties might participate in the general elections in a joint coalition.

Following the constitutional referendum in January 2022, the Sovereignists had claimed that 600,000 votes were falsified, and that they would not recognise the results of the referendum. An appeal was filed to the Republic Electoral Commission (RIK), although it ended up being rejected. Some of its members participated in a protest which occurred a day after the referendum.

2022 election 
In late January, the coalition was finalised, and Radulović announced their joint participation in the general elections. Its parliamentary list was announced by RIK on 23 February. Five days later, the Sovereignists had announced Branka Stamenković as their presidential candidate. During the campaign period, the Sovereignists had campaigned in cities across Serbia. The coalition won 2.2% of the popular vote and failed to cross the 3% threshold.

Political positions 
Since its inception, the coalition has rejected the left–right axis, instead claiming that, the modern division is between globalists and sovereignists. The coalition had also emphasised its eurosceptic views and its opposition to mandatory vaccination. Its representatives had also stated their opposition to NATO, and had stated that "Serbia must not impose sanctions on Russia". The coalition had also stated its support for the implementation of blockchain technology, and that it supports free textbooks for kindergartens and primary schools. Stamatović had commented that, farmers should receive greater help from the government. Vojin Biljić stated that Sovereignists would ensure transparency. In an interview, presidential candidate Stamenković stated her support for the introduction of mandatory conscription into the army.

Members

Electoral performance

Parliamentary elections

Presidential elections

Belgrade City Assembly elections

References

2021 establishments in Serbia
2022 disestablishments in Serbia
Defunct political party alliances in Serbia
Eurosceptic parties in Serbia
Political parties disestablished in 2022
Political parties established in 2021
Right-wing populism in Serbia